Roger Neville Walker  (born 1942) is a New Zealand architect based in Wellington.

Career
After graduating in architecture from the University of Auckland in the 1960s, Walker worked for the architecture firm Calder, Fowler & Styles, until he established his own practice in the early 1970s. He now runs Walker Architecture & Design in Wellington.

Like his compatriot Ian Athfield, Walker is notable for his unconventional design approach, which came out of a reaction against the then-dominant modernist architecture in the 1960s and 1970s.

Walker appeared in the 2021 TV series Designing Dreams, hosted by Matthew Ridge, in which he visited his favourite houses.

Honours and awards 
In the 1998 Queen's Birthday Honours, Walker was appointed an Officer of the New Zealand Order of Merit, for services to architecture. He was awarded the New Zealand Institute of Architects' highest honour, the Gold Medal, in 2016.

Selected designs 

 Mansell House (1st house designed in 1966), Highbury, Wellington (1968)
 Link Building, Wellington Waterfront (1969)
 Sotiri House, Highbury, Wellington (1969)
 Wellington Club (1969–72, demolished c. 1986)
 Centrepoint Arcade, Masterton (1972, demolished 1997)

 Whakatane Airport (1973–74)
 Cuttance House, Tirohanga, Lower Hutt
 Park Mews, Hataitai, Wellington (1974)
 Rainbow Springs Tourism Complex, Rotorua (1976–81)
 Britten House, Seatoun, Wellington (1977)
 Willis Street Village, Wellington (1979–80)
 Ainsworth House, Korokoro, Wellington (1970s)
 Waitomo Caves Visitor Centre
 Centre City Shopping Centre, New Plymouth (1985)
 Novotel Gardens Park Royal Hotel, Queenstown (1988, formerly the THC Queenstown)
 Ropata Lodge, Lower Hutt (1990)
 Chesterman Group Offices, Hamilton (1992–93)
 Pirie St Townhouses, Mount Victoria, Wellington
 Margrain Winery and Conference Centre, Martinborough (1990s)
 Sirocco Apartments, Wellington (1999)
 Thorndon School, Wellington (c. early 2000s)
 New World Supermarket, Thorndon, Wellington
 Century City Apartments (completed mid-2009)
 The Boundary townhouse complex, Wellington
  (cancelled after the bankruptcy of developer Terry Serepisos)
 Harris House, Lake Rotoroa
 St Patrick’s Church, Taumarunui
 Solitaire Lodge, Tarawera
 Wairakei Hotel Villas and recreational facilities, Taupo
 164 The Esplanade, Island Bay
 62 The Parade Paekakariki

See also
Ian Athfield
Miles Warren

References

Further reading
 Positively Architecture! New Zealand's Roger Walker by Gerald Melling, 1985.
 Roger Walker, architect: a thesis submitted in fulfilment of the requirements for the degree of Master of Arts in Art History  in the University of Canterbury by Abdel-moniem M. El-shorbagy.

External links
 Roger Walker Architecture and Design Ltd

1942 births
20th-century New Zealand architects
21st-century New Zealand architects
Living people
University of Auckland alumni
People from Hamilton, New Zealand
People from Wellington City
Officers of the New Zealand Order of Merit
Recipients of the NZIA Gold Medal